The Temperance (Scotland) Act 1913 is an Act of the Parliament of the United Kingdom under which voters in small local areas in Scotland were enabled to hold a poll to vote on whether their area remained "wet" or went "dry" (that is, whether alcoholic drinks should be permitted or prohibited).  The decision was made on a simple majority of votes cast.

Background

The Act was a result of the strong temperance movement in Scotland before the First World War. Brewers and publicans formed defence committees to fight temperance propaganda, and publicans became unwilling to spend money on improvements to their premises in case the district went "dry".  The Act was superseded by the Licensing (Scotland) Act 1959 which incorporated the same provisions as the 1913 Act and consolidated Scottish licensing law. These provisions and the local polls were abolished by the Licensing (Scotland) Act 1976.

There was resistance from the House of Lords to the passing of the Act, leading to threats to use the (relatively new) Parliament Act 1911 to pass it. In the end, these threats pressured the Lords to pass the act.

1920 referendums
The first opportunity to petition for a poll on local prohibition was in June 1920.  In order for a poll to be called, there had to be a petition signed by 10% of the registered voters in a burgh, parish or ward.  The first batch of polls were then held alongside municipal elections in November and December, the first being in Glasgow on 2 November.

The conditions required to prohibit the sale of alcohol in an area were strict.  Three options appeared on the poll: no change, a 25% reduction in licences to sell alcohol, and the abolition of all existing licences.  In order for prohibition to be implemented, that option required the support of at least 55% support of voters, and at least 35% of everyone registered to vote in the constituency.  However, if this option was not successful, all votes for "no licence" would be counted towards the 25% reduction tally.  The prohibition was also limited.  There was no proscription of the manufacture of alcoholic beverages, nor of their wholesale, or their consumption in private.  Local authorities were still permitted to license hotels and restaurants, providing that alcohol was only consumed with a meal.

Although temperance campaigners initially hoped to hold polls in at least 1,000 of the 1,200 licensing districts of Scotland, ultimately there were 584 successful petitions.  By the end of polling, in late December, 60% of votes had been cast for "no change", 38% for "no licence", and 2% for the reduction of licences.  About 40 districts voted in favour of prohibition, including Airdrie, Cambuslang, Kilsyth, Kirkintilloch, Parkinch, Stewarton and Whitehead.  Glasgow was a particular target for the prohibitionists.  At the 1920 poll, a majority of voters plumped for "no licence" in eleven wards, but due to the turnout and supermajority requirements, it was only successful in four.

Repeal attempts
In many newly dry districts, new polls were sponsored by licensees at the earliest possibility, three years later.  257 polls were held, in total, the majority being a second attempt at prohibition.  The next big wave came in 1927, when 113 were held, following which, prohibition remained in place in only seventeen wards.  Among these was Lerwick, where alcohol remained prohibited until 1947.

Between 1913 and 1965 1,131 polls were held under the Act and the same provisions in the 1959 Act, with the vast majority (1,079) held before 1930.  The holding of votes continued to tail off during the 1930s and 40s.  By 1970, there were still sixteen districts with prohibition, but just one or two new polls held annually.

References

Acts of the Parliament of the United Kingdom concerning Scotland
United Kingdom Acts of Parliament 1913
1913 in Scotland
Alcohol law in the United Kingdom
Repealed United Kingdom Acts of Parliament
Alcohol in Scotland
Scotland
Health law in Scotland
Multiple-choice referendums